The Sheffield & Hallamshire Junior Cup is a county cup competition involving teams within the Sheffield & Hallamshire County Football Association (S&HCFA).

Inaugurated in 1909, it is generally open to S&HCFA teams at levels 15 and below of the English football league system, although reserve teams at levels 13 and 14 also compete. Saturday clubs from outside the system also enter.

It is the third most important S&HCFA county cup, behind the Senior Cup and Association Cup.

2021-22 Participants 
Strikethrough denotes club that withdrew before playing a game.

Finals

See also
 Sheffield & Hallamshire Senior Cup
 Sheffield & Hallamshire Association Cup
 Sheffield & Hallamshire Junior Shield

References

External links 
 Official Site

Sport in Sheffield
Football in South Yorkshire
County Cup competitions